Roger George Cross (born 20 October 1948) is an English former professional footballer who played as a forward.

Playing career
Cross' association with West Ham began with his signing as an apprentice in July 1964. He was the top scorer in the reserve team for two seasons running, but failed to establish himself in the Hammers first team and was loaned to Leyton Orient in October 1968 for two months. In 1969, after 8 appearances and one goal for West Ham, he moved to Brentford for £10,000. Cross went on to play for Fulham, who signed him for £30,000 and he scored 10 goals in 45 league and cup appearances for the west London club. He had a second spell with Brentford and took his Bee's tally to 228 appearances and 79 goals. He then joined Millwall for £9,500 in January 1977. In 1977, Cross moved to the US to play for the Seattle Sounders of the North American Soccer League.

Coaching and scouting career
In 1979, he became youth team manager at Millwall. After a period on the coaching staff at Queens Park Rangers, he moved to Tottenham Hotspur, where he later became assistant manager to Gerry Francis. He rejoined West Ham as reserve team coach in the summer of 2001, later going on to become chief scout. In April 2011, West Ham sacked Cross from the role. He went on to scout for Charlton Athletic.

In 2018, he was appointed Head of Recruitment at Southend United.

Honours 

 Brentford Hall of Fame

References

External links
 

1948 births
Living people
Footballers from East Ham
Sportspeople from Essex
English footballers
Association football forwards
English Football League players
West Ham United F.C. players
Leyton Orient F.C. players
Brentford F.C. players
Fulham F.C. players
English expatriate footballers
North American Soccer League (1968–1984) players
Seattle Sounders (1974–1983) players
Millwall F.C. players
Millwall F.C. non-playing staff
Queens Park Rangers F.C. non-playing staff
Tottenham Hotspur F.C. non-playing staff
West Ham United F.C. non-playing staff
Charlton Athletic F.C. non-playing staff
Southend United F.C. non-playing staff
English expatriate sportspeople in the United States
Expatriate soccer players in the United States